{{DISPLAYTITLE:CH2N2}}
CH2N2 may refer to:

 Cyanamide, an organic compound
 Diazirine, class of organic molecules with a cyclopropene-like ring, 3H-diazirene
 Diazomethane, chemical compound discovered in 1894
 Isodiazomethane, parent compound of a class of derivatives of general formula R2N–NC
 Nitrilimine, class of organic compounds sharing a common functional group with the general structure R-CN-NR